Cyril Bentham Falls CBE (2 March 1888 – 23 April 1971) was a 20th Century British military historian, journalist, and academic, noted for his works on the First World War.

Early life
Falls was born in Dublin, Ireland, on 2 March 1888, the eldest son of Sir Charles Falls, an Ulster landowner in County Tyrone. He received his formal education at the Portora Royal School, Enniskillen, and London University. At the age of 27, he published his first book, 'Rudyard Kipling: A Critical Study' (1915).

World War 1
During World War 1 he received a commission into the British Army as a subaltern in the Royal Inniskilling Fusiliers. He served as a Staff Officer in the Headquarters of the 36th (Ulster) Division and the 62nd (2nd West Riding) Division during the conflict. He received the French Croix de Guerre, and was discharged from the British Armed Forces with the rank of captain.

Military history career
Immediately after leaving the British Army Falls wrote a history of one of the Divisions that he had served with during the war, entitled 'The History of the 36th (Ulster) Division', which was published in 1922.

From 1923 to 1939, he was employed by the Historical Section of the United Kingdom Government's Committee of Imperial Defence, researching and writing the text of several volumes of the British Government's 'Official History of the War'.

From 1939-1945, he was the military correspondent for The Times during World War II.

From 1946 to 1953, he held the post of Chichele Professor of Military History at All Souls College, Oxford. From the late 1940s through to the end of his life in the early 1970s he was a productive writer of military histories, publishing in-depth detailed studies as well as general works for the commercial market, his final two titles being published posthumously.

The historian Sir Michael Howard later described Falls' work 'The History of the 36th (Ulster) Division' (1922) as: ... containing some of the finest descriptions of conditions on the Western Front to be found anywhere in the literature of the war.

Death
Falls died in his 83rd year in Walton-on-Thames, in the county of Surrey, on 23 April 1971.

Publications

 
 
 
 
 
 War Books (1930)

References

External links
 
Times Literary Supplement contributor details
Others at worldcat.org
 

1888 births
1971 deaths
British Army General List officers
British Army personnel of World War I
British military historians
British military writers
Commanders of the Order of the British Empire
People educated at Bradfield College
Recipients of the Croix de Guerre 1914–1918 (France)
Royal Inniskilling Fusiliers officers
Historians of World War I
Fellows of All Souls College, Oxford
Military personnel from Dublin (city)
Chichele Professors of the History of War